is a Japanese role-playing browser game developed by DMM Games. An anime television series adaptation by Silver Link aired from January 8 to March 26, 2019.

Synopsis 
Many years into the future, advances in technology and virtual reality have changed Japan, leading to many applications in the real world, such as security, businesses, transportation and even the development of a new sport called Circlet Bout, an event played by many schools across the country. Mixed Reality, the technology used in Circlet Bout, can be used to store data about the players, such as their academic skills, and generate weapon for matches.

By sheer coincidence, Yuka Sasaki gets involved in a Circlet Bout match against Chikage Fujimura, the best player in Japan. Despite her inexperience, Yūka holds her own against Chikage and both players develop a respect for one another. Yūka gets inspired to become a CB player and, two years later, she transfers to a school in Tokyo in order to accomplish her dream. Upon her arrival, she finds out the school's CB club has been closed down, so she sets out to re-open it with her new friends.

Characters

 The protagonist. After her fateful match with Chikage, Yūka decides to become a CB player and sets out to re-open her new school's CB club. Her CB weapon is a sword. It, later on, revealed that she is capable of exploiting the "Overheat Phenomenon" that allows her to do short-cut attacks while simultaneously defending. She has a habit of putting Umeboshi or dried plums in her food.

 An athletic girl who develops an interest in Yūka after seeing her video of her fight with Chikage. Even before Yūka's arrival, she was already trying to revive the Union school's CB club but Yūka might be the opportunity she needs to bring the club back to its former glory. Her CB weapon is a double-bladed shuriken. She used to compete in track and field in middle school, but later on quit after being wrongfully accused of cheating, among the members of the circlet club she came from a rich family who owns a chain of shoe stores. 

 The Union school's student council president and the younger sister of famous CB player Ayana Kuroda. She initially opposes the reconstruction of the Union's CB club but she is forced to accept it when an opposing school issues a challenge for a practice match.

 A computer expert who helps Yūka and Miyuki re-open the Union school's CB club as the manager. She often wears an oversize White coat that used to belong to her father, who is one of the developers of the Circlet Bout and the technology around it. Initially, she has no interest in the Circlet Bout until her father's disappearance, where she got involve in order to track down her father's presence. In the Circlet Bout, she is basically tasked to analyze the opponent's capability and coming up with strategies that give her team the advantage. She doesn't actually compete in any bouts, but if she does, she is armed with a riot shield, but unlike the rest of her team who can take both offensive and defensive position, she is more on the defensive position where she relies on the arsenal of weapons that she installed in her shield that doesn't do her any good since she lacks any training to dodge any coming attacks.

 She is a foreign student at St. Union who is from Russia, she was recruited by Miyuki to join the circlet club and was designated as a reliever, in case any of the members weren't available to do battle in any Circlet bout for some reasons. She is very much stoic and laconic, often prefers to be alone. She spends most of her free time playing FPS on-line games where she excels in sniping, she uses a rifle as her weapon because she is more adept in taking down opponents from a distance than in close range. She also has a voracious appetite, where she can chug down a 2-liter cola bottle in just one sitting and still have enough room for other snacks.

 The top CB player in Japan. She gets impressed by Yūka's skill during an exhibition match and hopes they can play together again. It, later on, revealed that just like Yuka, she too can also exploit the "Overheat Phenomenon." 

/

 Siegfried is basically an AI bracelet that was given to Yuka after her exhibition match against Chikage. It is initially tasked to help improve her fighting skills, but from time to time it would also give her some moral advice.

Media

Game
DMM Games released the role-playing browser game in 2018. The game's world and scenario were created by Nachi Kio, character designs were provided by saitom, and Elements Garden produced the game's sound.

Anime
An anime television series adaptation was announced on August 9, 2018. The series is directed by Hideki Tachibana and written by Nachi Kio, with animation by studio Silver Link. Kazuyuki Yamayoshi is adapting the character designs from saitom's original illustrations. The series' music is composed by Yōichi Sakai and produced by Lantis. The series aired from January 8 to March 26, 2019 on Tokyo MX and AT-X. The series' opening theme song is "HEAT:Moment." by Miyuki Hashimoto while the series' ending theme song is "Circle-Lets Friends!" by Hashimoto, Sayaka Sasaki, Aki Misato, CooRie, yozuca*, and Minami. The series ran for 12 episodes.

Episode list

References

External links
  
  

2019 anime television series debuts
2018 video games
Anime television series based on video games
ASCII Media Works manga
Browser games
Japanese role-playing video games
Manga based on video games
Seinen manga
Silver Link
DMM Games games